Ralph Bauer may refer to:

 Ralph Norman Bauer (1899–1963), member of the Louisiana House of Representatives
 Ralph S. Bauer (1867–1941), mayor of Lynn, Massachusetts